San Polo di Piave is a comune (municipality) in the Province of Treviso in the Italian region Veneto, located about  north of Venice and about  northeast of Treviso.

The municipality of San Polo di Piave contains the frazione (subdivision) Rai and San Giorgio, where there is a beautiful and small church, built in 1200.

San Polo di Piave borders the following municipalities: Cimadolmo, Fontanelle, Ormelle, Vazzola.

Demographic evolution

References

External links
 www.comuneweb.it/SpoloHome/
 San Giorgio in San Polo di Piave

Cities and towns in Veneto